Stephen Lings is an English wildlife artist, illustrator and author. He has illustrated many newspapers, magazines and books, including some in the Thomas the Tank Engine series.

References

Living people
English illustrators
English male writers
Year of birth missing (living people)
Place of birth missing (living people)
English male artists